St. Ignatius' Convent Higher Secondary School is a school for girls  in Palayamkottai, Tirunelveli. The school is run by the Sisters of the Immaculate Heart of Mary. It is popularly known for its discipline and good education.

History 
Before the independence of India, there was a need for a girls' school in Tirunelveli. To meet this need, St. Ignatius' was founded in 1921 by a Belgian sister called Mother Marie Louise de Meester. Initially, when the school was started there were only three students, but has grown to nearly 4000 students.

Motto 
The motto of the school is Virtue is our strongest shield.

References

Catholic secondary schools in India
Christian schools in Tamil Nadu
Girls' schools in Tamil Nadu
High schools and secondary schools in Tamil Nadu
Education in Tirunelveli district